Ganibatum is a place and people mentioned in the 18th century BC Old Babylonian texts from Mari (modern Tell Harari). 

Ganibatum is believed to be located near Dur Yahdun Lim but other suggestions remain viable. In fact there may be several locations associated with the Ganibatum who appear involved in the transport of people and goods along the Euphrates and connected waterways. The Gnbtyw people (Genebtyw or Genebtyu) first appear in Year 32 of the reign of Thutmose III (ca. 1448 BC). and once again in a superscription dating to the time of Ramesses II (Kitchen 1999 p, 104-105). 

Previously the Gnbtyw have been sought to the south of Ancient Egypt and associated with the Land of Punt. But this association has relied almost entirely on the similarity of trade goods and uncertain textual contexts (Saleh, 1972). An identification with the Gnbtyw people bringing aromatic goods to Egypt after Thutmose III’s campaign to Syria in the mid 15th century BC has recently been proposed (Storck, 2005). If the newly proposed identification of Ganibatum with Gnbtyw finds acceptance, then the people/place of Ganibatum certainly moved after the destruction of Mari and the decline of Dur Yahdun Lim, perhaps to be connected with Galabatha near the confluence of the Balih and Euphrates (Burke, 1961). 

Thutmose III might have encountered the people of Ganibatum (Gnbtyw) in the course of his campaign that explicitly reached the Euphrates in Syria. Indeed slightly later campaigns of Thutmose III in Northern Syria resulted in “presents” (inw) from the even further lands of Babylon, Assur and “Great Hatti” (Singer, 2004 p. 605-607).

References

Madeleine Lurton Burke, “Ganibatim ville du Moyen Euphrate,” Revue d’Assyriologie 55 (1961) p. 147-151. 
Kenneth A. Kitchen, Ramesside Inscriptions, Translated & Annotated Notes and Comments Volume II: Ramesses II, Royal Inscriptions, (Blackwell Publishers, Oxford, England) 1999.
Abdel-Aziz Saleh, “The GNBTYW of Thutmosis III's Annals and the South Arabian GEB(B)ANITAE of the Classical Writers,” Bulletin de l'Institut Francais d'Archeaologie Orientale 72 (1972) p. 245-262.
Itamar Singer, “The Kurushtama Treaty Revisited,” p. 591-607 in SHARNIKZEL Hethitologische Studien Zum Gedenken an Emil Orgetorix Forrer edited by Detlev Groddek and Sylvester Rößle, Dresdner Beiträge zur Hethitologie, Band 10, 2004. 
Herbert A. Storck, “Ganibatum and Gnbtyw,” Journal of Ancient Civilizations 21 (2005) p. 113-123.

States and territories established in the 18th century BC
States and territories disestablished in the 15th century BC
Ancient Syria
Foreign contacts of ancient Egypt
Geography of ancient Egypt